Churchville Historic District is a national historic district located in Churchville, Northampton Township and Upper Southampton Township in Bucks County, Pennsylvania, USA. The district includes 140 contributing buildings, seven contributing structures and one contributing object in the crossroads village of Churchville. They include a variety of residential, commercial and institutional buildings and notable examples of Gothic Revival and Bungalow/craftsman architecture. Notable buildings include the John Hillings House (c. 1812), North and Southampton Dutch Reformed Church (1816), Churchville Train Station (1891), general store (1883), Studebaker and Willys car dealership (1920s), and Churchville Telephone Exchange (1900).

It was added to the National Register of Historic Places in 1995.

References

Historic districts in Bucks County, Pennsylvania
Historic districts on the National Register of Historic Places in Pennsylvania
National Register of Historic Places in Bucks County, Pennsylvania
Bungalow architecture in Pennsylvania
American Craftsman architecture in Pennsylvania
Gothic Revival architecture in Pennsylvania